Montgomery Township is the largest (in area) of the ten townships in Gibson County, Indiana as well as one of the largest townships by area in Southwestern Indiana, USA. At the 2010 census, its population was 3,996 and it contained 1,645 housing units, 75% of which were in areas adjacent to Owensville. Montgomery Township is served by the South Gibson School Corporation. Gibson Generating Station and Gibson Lake are located at the northern end of Montgomery Township.

Geography
Lakes in the township include Broad Pond (Gibson Lake), Burnett's Pond and Mauck's Pond. The Wabash River borders the northwest township line.

History 
"Purty Old Tom" is noted by the historian Gil R. Stormont as the origin of the name for the township, one of the original six created by the commissioners of the newly formed county in 1813. Thomas "Purty Old Tom" Montgomery came to southern Knox County in 1805 and marked an oak tree near a spring. Something delayed his return with his family to claim that land, so he ended up settling on the west bank of Black River near the present site of Owensville. He is mentioned on the Gibson County and Montgomery County, Kentucky page. He was one of seven sons of Hugh Montgomery, Sr., of Virginia to fight in the Revolutionary War.

Cities and towns 
 Owensville

Unincorporated towns
 Egg Harbor
 Johnson
 McGary
 Mounts
 Skelton
(This list is based on USGS data and may include former settlements.)

Adjacent townships and Precincts
 Indiana
 Gibson County
 Patoka Township (northeast)
 White River Township (northeast)
 Union Township (east)
 Johnson Township (southeast)
 Wabash Township (west)
 Posey County
 Smith Township (south)
 Robb Township (southwest)
 Illinois
Wabash County
 Coffee Precinct (Single point to the northwest)
 Mt. Carmel Precinct (northwest)

Cemeteries
The township contains ten cemeteries: Montgomery, Smith, Benson, Clark, Knowles, Mauck, Oak Grove, Old Union, Skelton, Owensville and Wilson.

Major highways
 Indiana State Road 64
 Indiana State Road 65
 Indiana State Road 165
 Indiana State Road 168

Education
 Owensville Community School

References
 U.S. Board on Geographic Names (GNIS)
 United States Census Bureau cartographic boundary files

External links
 Indiana Township Association
 United Township Association of Indiana
 Montgomery Township Cemeteries with photos of headstones (INGenWeb.org)

Townships in Gibson County, Indiana
Townships in Indiana